Alain Paco (born 1 March 1952) is a former French rugby union player and a current coach. He played as a hooker.

He played for AS Béziers. He went to win six titles of French Champion, for 1971, 1972, 1974, 1975, 1977 and 1978.

Paco earned his first national cap on 20 June 1974 against the Argentina. He played 35 times for France, from 1974 to 1980, culminating in a Five Nations Grand Slam in 1977.

Honours 
 Grand Slam : 1977
 French rugby champion, 1971, 1972, 1974, 1975, 1977 and 1978 with AS Béziers

External links
 http://www.espnscrum.com/statsguru/rugby/player/8282.html

1952 births
French rugby union players
Living people
Sportspeople from Béziers
France international rugby union players
Rugby union hookers
AS Béziers Hérault players
French rugby union coaches